Martin Hiller may refer to:
 Martin Hiller (canoeist), German sprint canoeist
 Martin H. Hiller, American entrepreneur